Sinuopeidae is an extinct family of fossil sea snails, Paleozoic gastropod mollusks.

This family is unassigned to superfamily. This family consists of three following subfamilies (according to the taxonomy of the Gastropoda by Bouchet & Rocroi, 2005):
 Sinuopeinae Wenz, 1938
 Platyschismatinae Knight, 1956
 Turbonellininae Knight, 1956

References 

Prehistoric gastropods